Upper Toklat Ranger Station No. 24, also known as the Upper Toklat River Cabin is a log shelter in the National Park Service Rustic style in Denali National Park.  The cabin is now part of a network of shelters for patrolling park rangers throughout the park.  It is a standard design by the National Park Service Branch of Plans and Designs and was built in  1930. The cabin is one of five cabins originally built by the Alaska Road Commission to provide shelter to crews working on park roads. The Upper Toklat River cabin is centrally located and was a distribution point for supplies.

References

External links

Buildings and structures in Denali Borough, Alaska
Ranger stations in Denali National Park and Preserve
Park buildings and structures on the National Register of Historic Places in Alaska
Log cabins in the United States
Rustic architecture in Alaska
Buildings and structures on the National Register of Historic Places in Denali Borough, Alaska
Log buildings and structures on the National Register of Historic Places in Alaska
1930 establishments in Alaska
National Register of Historic Places in Denali National Park and Preserve